Ohio Southern Railroad may refer to:

 Ohio Southern Railroad (1986), part of the Ohio Central Railroad System
 Ohio Southern Railroad (1881–1898), predecessor of the Detroit, Toledo and Ironton Railroad

See also 

 Southern Railway (disambiguation)